Barzi is a village in Baragaon block of Varanasi district, Uttar Pradesh, India. 

In the 2011 census Barzi was shown as having a population of 4,713 people in 698 households.

References

Villages in Varanasi district